The Malad River is a river located within Gooding County, and Oneida County, Idaho, Idaho, United States, and is a tributary of the Snake River.

Description
The river is formed by the confluence of the Big Wood River and the Little Wood River near Gooding.

The river flows through Thousand Springs State Park, where it tumbles down a stairstep waterfall.

The river's flow is affected by numerous reservoirs and irrigation works on its tributaries. The Malad River itself is largely diverted into a power flume that enters the Snake below the mouth of the Malad, via a powerhouse. Below the diversion the Malad River is replenished by numerous springs, yet the average flow above the diversion is higher than at the river's mouth.

The Malad River is part of the Columbia River basin, being a tributary of the Snake River, which is a tributary to the Columbia River.

The name of the river stems from French , via Rivière aux Malades ('river of the sick'), presumably as a reference to some illness suffered by early French-Canadian trappers who investigated the area.

See also

 List of rivers of Idaho

Notes

References

External links

Rivers of Idaho
Tributaries of the Snake River
Rivers of Gooding County, Idaho